Coccothrinax yuraguana is a palm which is endemic to western Cuba.

Henderson and colleagues (1995) considered C. yuraguana to be a synonym of Coccothrinax miraguama.

References

yuraguana
Trees of Cuba
Plants described in 1850